The Raid on Cherbourg took place in August 1758 during the Seven Years' War when a British force was landed on the coast of France by the Royal Navy with the intention of attacking the town of Cherbourg as part of the British government's policy of "descents" on the French coasts.

Background

Since 1757 the policy of the British government to use their naval superiority to launch raids against the French coast, to act as a diversion - drawing French forces and resources away from Germany where Britain's allies Prussia, Hanover and Brunswick were under severe pressure. In Autumn 1757 a British expedition to Rochefort had captured an offshore island, but not made an effort to capture the town. In 1758 the Duke of Brunswick asked the British to put this policy into action as his Allied force was being pushed back. A large naval and military force was assembled in southern England under the direction of George Anson, the First Lord of the Admiralty. In June 1758 the British had launched a Raid on St Malo. Following the perceived success of this, a further raid was planned and it was announced that Prince Edward, the younger brother of the Prince of Wales would accompany the expedition.

Raid
The British forces were under the command of Lieutenant General Thomas Bligh with the offshore naval contingent commanded by Richard Howe. They cruised along the coast of Normandy threatening a number of ports, before arriving outside Cherbourg on 7 August. The conditions were favourable and they were able to make a successful landing at Urville-Nacqueville beach. Once ashore they brushed aside the small French force defending Cherbourg, and stormed it, capturing the town. They set about destroying the fortifications and port. On 16 August, the British left Cherbourg and re-embarked having stayed exactly a week.

Aftermath
News of the expedition boosted morale in Britain. The newspapers observed that it was the first successful landing of any significant size since the Hundred Years War. The scheme had been a favourite project of William Pitt and he was insistent that further raids be launched on the French coast. In September 1758 Bligh tried to capture St Malo, but the weather allowed him to land only part of his force, who were quickly confronted by a superior French force. Bligh tried to withdraw to his ships, which he eventually did, after suffering heavy casualties at the Battle of Saint Cast. This brought an end to the policy of "descents", as the British committed more troops to fight in Germany rather than risk another failed raid.

Despite this the raids had been a success as they had weakened French morale, and convinced them that even parts of Metropolitan France were vulnerable to British naval power. In response France planned a major invasion of Britain, designed to knock them out of the war, but it had to be abandoned owing to naval defeats.

See also
 Naval Descents

References

Bibliography
 Anderson, Fred. Crucible of War: The Seven Years' War and the Fate of Empire in British North America, 1754-1766. Faber and Faber, 2001
 Middleton, Richard. The Bells of Victory: The Pitt-Newcastle Ministry and the Conduct of the Seven Years' War, 1757-1762. Cambridge University Press, 1985.
 Rodger, N. A. M. The Command of the Ocean: A Naval History of Britain, 1649-1815. Penguin Books, 2006.
 Simms, Brendan. Three Victories and a Defeat: The Rise and Fall of the First British Empire. Penguin Books (2008)

Conflicts in 1758
Battles of the Seven Years' War
1758 in France
History of Cherbourg-en-Cotentin
Military raids
Battles involving Great Britain
Battles involving France